Formula Drift (also known as Formula D) is a United States-based motorsport drifting series. Formula Drift, Inc. was co-founded by Jim Liaw and Ryan Sage in 2003 as a sister company to Slipstream Global Marketing, the same partnership that introduced D1 Grand Prix to the United States. The new entity would solely own, operate and launch the first official drifting series in North America. Formula D is not affiliated with the FIA series of formula racing championships.

With 60 currently licensed drivers competing in PRO and PROSPEC (formerly PRO 2), Formula Drift is recognized as the premier North American professional drifting championship series.  The series consists of an eight-round championship played out at race tracks across North America. Judged on line, angle, and style, rather than who finishes the course in the fastest time, Formula Drift brings together traditional racing and extreme sports.

North America
Drivers in North America can compete in regionally sanctioned PRO/AM organizations for licensing.

East10Drift – Southeast
Evergreen Drift  – Pacific Northwest
Lone Star Drift  – Texas
ND Drift - Minnesota
Southwest Drift - Las Vegas
Western Canada Drifting series
The Drift League - California
Full Lock Drift - Oklahoma
US Drift Circuit - Florida 

Winners and high finishers of these feeders series are then able to enter the Formula DRIFT PROSPEC series, a secondary national tour where they compete to move up to the main series.

Abroad

Drivers from around the world have set their sights on Formula Drift as the series of choice worldwide in which to compete.  This also includes the legions of talented drivers from Japan, who have competed previously in the D1 Grand Prix. Other drivers who crossed over to Formula Drift from foreign series are the Irish drivers Darren McNamara, James Deane, Eric O'Sullivan, and Dean Kearney.  These drivers rose to acclaim in their European home series before making the move stateside.

Tracks

Current tracks
 Grand Prix of Long Beach in Long Beach, California.  Seasons 2006 –
 Road Atlanta in Braselton, Georgia.  Seasons 2004 –
 Lake Erie Speedway in Erie, Pennsylvania.  Season 2021 – 
 Evergreen Speedway in Monroe, Washington. Seasons 2006 –
 Orlando Speed World in Orlando, Florida.  Season 2015 –
 Old Bridge Township Raceway Park in Englishtown, New Jersey.  Season 2008 –
 Irwindale Speedway in Irwindale, California.  Season 2004 –
 World Wide Technology Raceway in Madison, Illinois. Seasons 2018 –

Former tracks
 Wall Speedway in Wall, New Jersey.  Seasons 2005–2007, 2009–2019
 Autodrome Saint-Eustache in Saint-Eustache, Quebec. Seasons 2015 – 2017
 Palm Beach International Raceway in Palm Beach, Florida.  Seasons 2011 – 2013
 Las Vegas Motor Speedway in Las Vegas, Nevada.  Seasons 2009 – 2012
 Summit Point Motorsports Park in Summit Point, West Virginia. Season 2007
 Reliant Center in Houston, Texas. Seasons 2004 – 2005
 Soldier Field in Chicago, Illinois.  Season 2005 – 2006
 Sonoma Raceway in Sonoma, California. Seasons 2004 – 2013

International presence
Formula Drift has increased its international presence every year since 2008 with the addition of demonstration and sister series in other countries.  "Taking the Formula Drift brand internationally is a huge milestone. Our priority is to continue to build the Series here while growing the sport of drifting as a whole," said Jim Liaw, president and co-founder of Formula Drift. "We are very careful in choosing our event partners and take careful consideration of the boundaries of our international affiliates such as Drift Australia, MSC, and Pro Drift."

Sister series
Formula Drift Asia.  Formula Drift Asia was created in 2008 with the inaugural FD Singapore competition. The first real international competition of its in Asia, held at the Changi Air Show Grounds. This historic event was sold out before the gates opened. Since then, Formula Drift Asia became its own championship series, the first Pan-Asian professional drifting championship. In 2009 and 2010, the Championship made stops in Singapore, Thailand and Malaysia.
For the 2011/2012 Championship tour, Formula Drift Asia added an additional stop in Indonesia.
Rd.1  Marina Bay Street Circuit, Marina Bay, Singapore Season 2010
Rd.2  Bangkok Wonderworld, Bangkok, Thailand Season 2010
Rd.3  Dataran Merdeka Kuala Lumpur, Malaysia.  Season 2010
The first Formula Drift Asia Champion was Tengku Djan.

Exhibition events
 Date TBD International Competition – Qatar Racing Club
 Date TBD International Competition – Yas Marina Circuit
 February 5, 2012 Demonstration – Figali Convention Center
May 27, 2012 International Competition – Location TBD
 June 11, 2011 Formula Drift Ultimate Challenge at Texas Motor Speedway, Fort Worth, TX
 February 25, 2011 Yas Marina Circuit, Abu Dhabi, UAE
 February 12, 2011 Figali Convention Center, Ciudad de Panamá, Panamá
 January 17, 2010 Figali Convention Center, Ciudad de Panamá, Panamá
 March 8, 2009 Figali Convention Center, Ciudad de Panamá, Panamá
 August 23, 2008 Monterrey Autodromo, Monterrey, Mexico
 April 27, 2008 Changi Air Show Grounds, Singapore

Regulations 
Formula Drift has continued to refine its rulebook and technical regulations year to year in terms of car and competition regulations.

Car eligibility 
Cars and their builds are constantly under review by the Formula Drift staff.  The rule book is revised every year to promote fair and exciting drifting.  Some cars and practices are written out of the rule book in order to keep a realistic and level playing field.  During the 2004 season, the Dodge Viper Competition Coupe was permitted to compete; subsequently it was ineligible in Formula Drift.

Although Formula Drift does not permit front-wheel drive cars, it does allow all-wheel drive cars to be converted to rear wheel drive, such as the Subaru WRX and Mitsubishi EVO.  In the United States, the Scion tC is sold only in the FWD layout, but because it shares the same chassis as the AWD Toyota Avensis (sold only in the United Kingdom and Europe), it can be converted to a competition-ready RWD layout. This change sparked great debate between drifters in the series who felt that an original FWD vehicle should not be eligible due to the front cross member changes needed.

A trademark of Formula D competition cars is the very open engine rulebook.  Formula Drift allows engines from other manufacturers to be swapped into competition cars.  "Engine, transmission, ECU and/or final drive modifications are free, but only the rear wheels may propel the vehicle".  This results in a huge variety of engine/chassis combinations as well as huge power outputs commonly in excess of 850+ whp.  Vehicles wishing to compete for the Manufacturers Championship must use an engine from the same manufacturer as the chassis.  Engine swaps remain very common with older models but can be seen with new builds as well. Naturally aspirated Chevrolet V8 engines are often used because of their availability and lower operating costs.

Suspension modification is widely open to development as long as stock pickup locations are utilized.  Suspension tuning is a vital part of any successful Formula D team.

To keep cars in check Formula D institutes a maximum tire size based on the vehicles total weight.

Formula Drift cars are given fixed numbers for their cars and are not necessarily based on rankings.

Scoring and judging 
Formula D uses its own scoring system that may differ from other drifting organizations. Often scoring systems for qualifying, tandem battles, and penalties are different.

Qualifying – Formula D competitors are allowed two non-consecutive judged solo runs to post their highest possible score in order to compete. The top 32 drivers with the highest qualifying scores are entered in a competition bracket pairing the highest scoring drivers against the lowest scoring drivers.  1st v. 32nd, 2nd v. 31st, 3rd v. 30th, etc. The drivers are judged on line, speed, angle, and overall impact.  The judges can also make additional request at the drivers meeting for actions or techniques that will weigh in their decision making (ex; entry technique, racing line, proximity, etc.).  Formula D drivers are scored on a points-deduction system where every driver will start their judged run with a perfect score of 100 pts. For every mistake, points will be deducted. These points will vary between .25 point to the most severe mistakes (-1.75).

Competition – The top 32 qualifying drivers are paired up in an elimination bracket pairing the highest scoring drivers against the lowest scoring drivers.  The biggest difference from qualifying is that now drivers face off head to head on the track in a tandem battle.  The two cars run together side by side, each driver trying to show greater skill than the other.  The highest qualifying driver leads on the first run, then on the second run the lower qualifying driver leads. Drivers are judged on the same basic criteria as qualifying but an emphasis is put on the interaction between the two drivers competing head to head.  The lead driver will set the pace and driving line often trying to produce a gap between themselves and the following driver.  The following driver will try to stay on top of the lead driver as close as possible without making contact with their vehicle.  The goal is to mimic or "shadow" the lead drivers run while staying on their door throughout the run.  It is possible for either driver to win either run.  Often one driver will have a points advantage going into the second run.  Driver mistakes (ex. 2 wheels off course, spinning out, avoidable contact, etc.) can also cause them to be given an automatic zero.  The three-judge panel then will look at both runs and determine one of three outcomes; Driver 1 advances, Driver 2 advances, or if a winner can not be determined a "One More Time" will be called.  In the event of a "One More Time" the drivers will then complete a new pair of runs.  The drivers will face off again until a winner can be determined. The winner advance to the next bracket.

Competition Time Out – Drivers have a one-time option to utilize a "Competition Time Out" in order to attempt to fix their vehicle.  In the event that a driver or car can not come to the start line in time for their tandem run the other driver will be allowed to run a solo lap to advance.

Overtaking – Follow cars are permitted to overtake or pass in certain instances.  passes may only happen at inside clips, and can only be done so if the lead car is off line enough to allow the follow car to pass between them and the clip.  If a successful pass is made the lead car run is deemed a zero.

The current judges are Ryan Lanteigne (2011-), Brian Eggert (2012-), Chris Uhl (2020-). Kevin Wells is the Competition Director for the series.

Formula Drift Champions

United States 

Note: Chris Forsberg is first formula D driver who managed to win 3 seasons (2009, 2014 and 2016).
The second one to win 3 formula D season is James Deane, and the third is Fredric Aasbø (2015, 2021, 2022). Although he's the second driver who managed to win 3 seasons, Deane is the first and only Formula D driver who managed to win 3 seasons in a row (2017, 2018 and 2019).

Asia

PROSPEC Champions

Honors

Rookie of the Year
2006  Bill Sherman – Nissan 240SX
2007  Darren McNamara – Toyota Corolla Coupe GT/Nissan SR20
2008  Michihiro Takatori – Nissan Skyline ER34
2009  Eric O'Sullivan – Subaru Impreza WRX STI
2010  Fredric Aasbø – Toyota Supra JZA80
2011  Aurimas "Odi" Bakchis – Nissan Silvia S14
2012  Daigo Saito – Lexus SC430
2013  Mats Baribeau – Toyota Mark II
2014  Geoff Stoneback – Nissan Silvia S14
2015  Masashi Yokoi – Nissan Silvia S15
2016  Alex Heilbrunn – BMW E46 M3
2017  Piotr Wiecek – Nissan Silvia S15
2018  Dirk Stratton – Chevy Corvette
2019  Travis Reeder – Nissan 240SX
2020  Adam LZ – Nissan Silvia S15
2021  Simen Olsen – Toyota GR Supra

Most Improved Driver
2007  Bill Sherman – Nissan 240SX
2008  Stephan Verdier – Subaru Impreza WRX STI
2009  Stephan Verdier – Cooper Tire Subaru Impreza WRX STi
2010  Mad Mike Whiddett – Mazda RX8
2011  Matt Powers – Nissan 240SX
2012  Robbie Nishida – Lexus SC300
2013  Darren McNamara – Nissan Silvia S14
2014  Dean Kearney – Dodge Neon
2015  Alec Hohnadell – Nissan Silvia S14
2018  Matt Field – Nissan Silvia S14
2019  Ryan Litteral – Nissan 350Z
2020  Taylor Hull – Cadillac ATS

Driver of the Year
2007  Chris Forsberg
2008  Ryan Tuerck
2009  Chris Forsberg
2013  Fredric Aasbø

Hardest Charging Driver
2007  Chris Forsberg
2008  Robbie Nishida
2010  Fredric Aasbø
2011  Matt Powers
2012  Daigo Saito
2013  Robbie Nishida
2014  Chelsea DeNofa
2017  Jhonnattan Castro
2018  Chelsea DeNofa
2019   Piotr Wiecek
2020  Chelsea DeNofa

Spirit of Drifting
2007  Joon Maeng
2008  Patrick Mordaunt
2009  Taka Aono
2011  Walker Wilkerson
2012  Danny George
2013  Robbie Nishida
2014  Forrest Wang
2015  Ken Gushi
2018  Michael Essa
2019  Pat Goodin
2020  Jeff Jones / Rome Charpentier (tie)

Superstar of the Year
2008  Tanner Foust

Best Drifting Style
2008  Daijiro Yoshihara
2011  Daijiro Yoshihara
2012  Fredric Aasbø
2013  Daigo Saito
2018  Forrest Wang
2019  Chelsea Denofa
2020  Chris Forsberg

Best Personal Style 
2011  Matt Powers
2012  Ryan Tuerck
2013  Matt Powers
2014  Ryan Tuerck

Best Looking Car
2011  Matt Field's S14

Crew Member of the Year
2011  Mike Kojima
2012  Mike Kojima
2014  Brian Wilkerson
2015  Nathan Tasukon
2018  Stan Williams
2019  Jimmie Cadwell
2020  Jason Dixon

Team Manager of the Year
2010  Jonathon Bradford
2011  Chris Forsberg
2012  Stephan Papadakis
2013  Michael Essa
2014  Stephan Papadakis
2015  Kenji Sumino
2018  Stephan Papadakis
2019  Stephan Papadakis
2020  Stephan Papadakis

Comeback of the Year
2011  Rhys Millen
2013  Michael Essa
2015  Dean Kearney
2018  Matt Coffman
2019  Ryan Tuerck

Fan Favorite
2011  Walker Wilkerson
2013  Fredric Aasbø
2014  Fredric Aasbø
2018  James Deane
2019  Matt Field
2020  Adam LZ

All-time Formula Drift Pro event winners list
1.  Fredric Aasbø – 18 wins 
- 2014 at Wall Speedway and Texas - 2015 at Long Beach, Wall, Seattle, and Irwindale
- 2016 at Orlando and Canada
- 2017 at Orlando and Canada
- 2018 at Long Beach And St. Louis
- 2019 Road Atlanta
- 2020 at St. Louis (Rd1) And Irwindale (Rd7)
- 2021 at St. Louis
- 2022 at Road Atlanta and Irwindale

2.  Vaughn Gittin, Jr. – 12 wins 
- 2008 at Irwindale 
- 2010 at Long Beach and Sonoma
- 2012 at Wall Speedway and   Seattle 
- 2014 at Road Atlanta and Miami - 2016 at Road Atlanta and Wall Speedway
- 2018 at Irwindale
- 2020 at Seattle (Rd 3)
- 2020 at Seattle (Rd 4)

3.  Chris Forsberg – 10 wins 
2005 at Irwindale; 2007 at Road Atlanta and Infineon; 2008 at Long Beach; 2009 at Road Atlanta and Seattle; 2013 at Seattle; 2014 at Long Beach; 2018 at Orlando; 2020 at Texas (Rd 6)

4.  Samuel Hübinette – 9 wins 
2004 at Road Atlanta, Houston, and Infineon; 2005 at Road Atlanta and Chicago; 2006 at Long Beach, Chicago and Wall Speedway; 2007 at Summit Point

5.  Aurimas Bakchis – 9 wins 
2015 at Road Atlanta; 2016 at Seattle; 2017 at Wall Speedway; 2019 at Long Beach and Orlando; 2020 at Irwindale (Rd 8); 2021 at Road Atlanta, Long Beach and Irwindale

6.  Daijiro Yoshihara – 8 wins 
2006 at Irwindale; 2007 at Seattle and Wall Speedway; 2010 at Road Atlanta and Wall Speedway; 2011 at Road Atlanta and Monroe; 2013 at Long Beach

7.  James Deane – 7 wins 
2017 at Long Beach, Road Atlanta, Seattle and Texas, 2018 at Wall Speedway, 2018 at Monroe, 2019 at St. Louis

8.  Tanner Foust – 7 wins 
2006 at Road Atlanta; 2007 at Irwindale; 2008 at Englishtown and Sonoma; 2009 at Las Vegas; 2010 at Seattle and Irwindale

9.  Rhys Millen – 7 wins
2004 at Irwindale; 2005 at Wall; 2006 at Infineon; 2008 at Road Atlanta and Seattle; 2011 at Las Vegas; 2012 at Las Vegas

10.  Daigo Saito – 6 wins 
2012 at Palm Beach and Irwindale; 2013 at Road Atlanta, Wall Speedway and Irwindale; 2014 at Irwindale

11.  Chelsea Denofa – 7 wins
2016 at Long Beach; 2019 at Texas; 2020 at St .Louis ( 
rd 2), 2021 at Orlando; 2021 at Lake Erie; 2021 at Seattle; 2022 at Seattle

12.  Ryan Tuerck – 6 wins 
2009 at Long Beach and Irwindale; 2015 at Orlando, 2019 at Wall Speedway, 2020 at Texas (Rd5), 2022 at Long beach

13.  Justin Pawlak – 4 wins 
2011 at Long Beach and Palm Beach; 2012 at Long Beach and Road Atlanta

14.  Matt Field – 3 wins 2016 at Texas and Irwindale; 2021 at Englishtown

15.  Piotr Więcek – 3 wins 
2017 at Irwindale; 2018 at Texas; 2019 at Seattle

16.  Ken Gushi 3 wins
2005 at Houston; 2019 at Irwindale, 2022 at Grantsille Utah

17.  Tyler McQuarrie – 2 wins 2010 at Las Vegas; 2011 at Irwindale

18.  Michael Essa – 2 wins 2013 at Palm Beach and Texas

19.  Darren McNamara – 2 wins 2009 at Wall Speedway; 2014 at Monroe

One win each for:
  Alex Pfeiffer (2004 invitational at Irwindale featuring the top 16 Formula D drivers from 2004)
  Calvin Wan (2005 at Infineon)
  Yukinobu Okubo (2006 at Seattle)
  Mitsuru Haraguchi (2007 at Long Beach)
  Toshiki Yoshioka (2008 at Las Vegas)
  Stephan Verdier (2009 at Infineon
  Conrad Grunewald (2011 at Wall Speedway)
  Masashi Yokoi (2015 at Texas)
  Kristaps Bluss (2018 at Road Atlanta)
  Dylan Hughes (2022 at Orlando)
  Travis Reeder (2022 at Englishtown)
  Kazuya Taguchi (2022 at St. Louis)

To this date, only five drivers
have won both Formula Drift and D1 Grand Prix events, they are Mitsuru Haraguchi, Toshiki Yoshioka, Vaughn Gittin, Jr., Daigo Saito, and Chris Forsberg.

Drivers list

2022

PRO

PROSPEC

Formula Drift television coverage 

Former Fox Soccer United States host Brandon Johnson hosted the Formula D show for G4 in 2006. Rossi Morreale was the show's host in 2005. Johnson was joined by Attack of the Show co-host Olivia Munn who covered the pits and drivers during the events and drifting expert Adam Matthews who provided commentary and insight on the tandem battles. G4 aired each round on a tape-delayed basis.  Jarod DeAnda is the public address announcer at each event, earning him the moniker, "The Voice of Formula D." In 2005, G4 used DeAnda's event commentary track, but for 2006, used Johnson and Matthews calling each battle like a typical play-by-play/color commentator combination. Johnson and Matthews were on-site for each event, but it sounded as if they had taped their commentary after the event had already taken place. This practice is not uncommon in the motorsports business in post-production.

In the 2005 season, there were two people working the pits — driver interviewer Mayleen Ramey, who was a roving reporter for the half-hour episodes, and a second anchor, who patrolled around the car show at each event. In 2005, G4 used three reporters for this job. From the round in Wall to the round in Houston, actor Emeka Nnadi held the job. At the Infineon round, Attack of the Show! co-host Kevin Pereira took the duties, while Street Fury host Big C finished things out in Chicago and Irwindale. Also, G4 showed half-hour episodes in-between rounds, most of which focused on the network having its own drift car built from scratch, with other segments focusing on the aspects of drifting. One of the first half-hour episodes in 2005 had one Formula D competitor, Chris Forsberg go to Japan, and meet up with another competitor, Daijiro Yoshihara, to explore the country and get more perspective on the birth of drifting. Episodes that featured event coverage lasted an hour and a half, and featured the top 16 tandem rounds, including those that needed to be run again, because the judges deemed them too close to call. These episodes aired the night after the next round in the series had already taken place.

In 2006, however, coverage was dramatically different. The half-hour episodes were gone, event coverage was reduced to an hour, and their scheduling was quite random. The Long Beach and Atlanta rounds premiered on June 18, with the Chicago round airing on July 2, and the Sonoma round airing a week after it took place. During the Sonoma round, G4 noted that the Seattle round would premiere on September 10, but that date was changed to October 8, with the last two rounds (Wall and Irwindale) airing every other week afterward. These episodes featured more interviews and driver profiles, many of which would've been placed in a half-hour show last year, and many of the tandem battles have been cut out, and any battle that needed to be run again did not have its second run shown. This led to some criticism from those in the drifting community, including fans and some Formula D drivers.

At the 2006 SEMA Show in Las Vegas, Formula D co-founders Jim Liaw and Ryan Sage announced that the series would have a new television partner in 2007. That partner was ESPN2. Each round began airing in a one-hour block on November 15 with the Long Beach round. All subsequent airings were supposed to be every Thursday afterward, but beginning with the Evergreen Speedway round on December 5, the air dates for new rounds switched to Wednesday.

The ESPN deal lasted just one season. SPEED Channel aired all rounds of the 2008 Formula D season, as well as the World Championship, scheduled for after the Irwindale round. Events aired on Sundays, beginning with the Long Beach round on October 26; all airings began at 4 PM Eastern.

For 2010, Formula Drift announced a comprehensive race programming schedule with the sports network then known as Versus (ironically co-owned with G4 by Comcast). The seven-stop Formula DRIFT Championship Series programs aired over fourteen Sundays during the 2 PM (EST) / 11 AM (PST) time slot beginning Sunday, August 30. Each episode showcased all the on- and off-track action as the world's top drift drivers battle for the coveted title of Formula DRIFT Champion. The first episode, aired on August 30, will feature a comprehensive overview of the sport and drivers. Each episode re-aired the week following the initial airing. Coverage was slated to remain the same for the 2011 season.

In 2012, as a result of NBCUniversal's acquisition by Comcast, Comcast's sports channels were combined under the NBC Sports division, in an arrangement known as the NBC Sports Group; this resulted in Versus being re-launched as the NBC Sports Network on January 2, 2012.

Formula D coverage moved to CBS Sports Network for the 2015 season.

Internet Coverage
In 2010 Formula D joined forces with Justin.tv to bring a live stream of all 7 events.  All rounds were broadcast via Justin.tv complete with practices and all rounds of competition were included.  During the 2010 season over 1,000,000 viewers tuned in to watch the live action unfold over the 7 Pro Championship events.

2013 Formula D partnered with Livestream for the domestic series.

2014 Formula D partnered with Daily Motion for its live stream.

Formula D now broadcasts online at Formula Drift Live and on Motor Trend On Demand.

Print Coverage
At the 2010 SEMA show, FD co-founder Jim Liaw announced the Formula Drift would begin the quarterly publication of a Formula Drift's magazine in 2011.  The publication will be handled by Haymarket Media Group.

References

External links 

 
Wrecked Magazine - Drifting's home in the United States
DriftLive.com - Unofficial Formula D Coverage

 
Recurring sporting events established in 2004
Auto racing series in the United States